Timmia is a genus of moss.  It is the only genus in the family Timmiaceae and order Timmiales.  The genus is named in honor of the 18th-century German botanist Joachim Christian Timm.

The genus Timmia includes only four species:

References

External links

Moss genera
Bryopsida